Buttmann is a German surname. Notable people with the surname include:

Philipp Karl Buttmann (1764–1829), German philologist and expert on the Greek language
Rudolf Buttmann, German ambassador to the Vatican in the early 20th century

See also
Butman (disambiguation)
Buttman
Peräsmies, whose name translates into English as "Butt Man"

German-language surnames